The Atari Joystick Controller TV Video Game System was made in 2003 (copyright 2002) in Jakks Pacific's Plug It In & Play TV Games plug-n-play game system lineup. The device itself is designed to look like the joystick used on the Atari 2600.

Games list
 Adventure
 Asteroids
 Breakout
 Centipede
 Circus Atari
 Gravitar
 Missile Command
 Pong
 Volleyball
 Yars' Revenge

Basic Fun version
In 2017, Basic Fun released a version of this joystick called Atari 2600 Plug & Play Joystick with the game list otherwise being the same except with Canyon Bomber, Crystal Castles, and Warlords replacing Circus Atari, Pong, and Yars' Revenge.

See also
 Handheld TV game
 Atari Flashback

References

Atari
Dedicated consoles